This is a list of mayors (Stadtammann) of Baden, Aargau, Switzerland.

References 

Baden, Switzerland
Lists of mayors (complete 1900-2013)
Aargau
Baden, Switzerland